The Ceair is a left tributary of the river Urluia in Romania. It flows into the Urluia near Tufani.

References

Rivers of Romania
Rivers of Constanța County